The Rajasthan women's cricket team is an Indian domestic cricket team representing the Indian state of Rajasthan. The team has represented the state in Women's Senior One Day Trophy (List A) and  Senior women's T20 league.

References

Women's cricket teams in India
Cricket in Rajasthan